Isaac Newton Van Nuys (November 20, 1836 – February 12, 1912) was an American businessman, farmer and rancher who owned the entire southern portion of the San Fernando Valley—an area 15 miles long and 6 miles wide.  With the approach of the Owens River aqueduct, and the possibility of intensive small farming, Los Angeles speculators, including Harry Chandler of the Los Angeles Times, combined to buy out Van Nuys in 1909 and develop the San Fernando Valley.

Isaac Van Nuys was not the founder of Van Nuys in 1911—he died in 1912—but was made the honorary godfather of the hardscrabble town, later to be the Valley's center, by the development syndicate as a promise in the land sale.

Still, as a pioneer resident and honorary godfather of Van Nuys, there are schools, streets, libraries, and a Liberty Ship with the name of Van Nuys.

Biography

Early life
Isaac Van Nuys was born in West Sparta, New York, the son of Peter Van Nuys and Harriet Kerr. His father was born in Millstone, New Jersey, on February 7, 1808. He moved to West Sparta, in 1822, where he became a farmer and eventually owned . He also served as a town supervisor and justice of the peace. He died January 2, 1875. Their patrilineal ancestor was Auke Jans van Nuys, a Dutch carpenter who came to New Netherland around 1651 from Nuis, in western Groningen. The mother of Isaac Van Nuys was born in Cayuga County, New York, on April 13, 1809. Peter and Harriet were married on November 19, 1829. They had seven children, Caroline M. Van Nuys (born June 4, 1833); Isaac N.; A. Vinton Van Nuys (born June 8, 1840); Ella L. Van Nuys (November 22, 1842 – July 22, 1843); Harriett E. Van Nuys (January 9, 1844 – August 9, 1871); Webster B. Van Nuys (born February 8, 1847); and Herbert K. Van Nuys (born April 22, 1852).

He attended the academy at Lima, in which he was a student for one year. His relatives emigrated from the Netherlands and located on Long Island, New York.

Career
San Fernando Homestead Association
In 1865, at the age of 29, Van Nuys was the first family member to move to California. He first lived in Napa, and later in Monticello where he owned a country store. In 1871, he moved to Los Angeles, where he bought in with Isaac Lankershim's corporation, the San Fernando Homestead Association, that in 1869 had bought the southern half of Rancho Ex-Mission San Fernando totaling 60,000 acres (240 km2) and engaged in the raising of stock, principally sheep. In 1873, Van Nuys, and future brother-in-law Isaac Lankershim's son, James Boon Lankershim, moved to the San Fernando Valley and assumed management of the property. In 1874, they began raising grain, introducing dryland farming. In 1876 they filled two ships with Valley wheat at the Los Angeles Harbor in San Pedro. It was both the first grain cargo shipped from the L.A. Harbor, and the first grain shipped to Europe from California.

Los Angeles Farming and Milling Company
In 1880, Van Nuys and James Boon Lankershim formed the Los Angeles Farming and Milling Company from the San Fernando Homestead Association. Isaac Van Nuys was its president and manager. The company had a four-story building for milling to produce flour, meals, cracked wheat, hominy and livestock feed. Van Nuys also served as vice-president of the Farmers and Merchants Bank, a director in the Union Bank of Savings, a director in the Los Angeles Pressed Brick Company, and owner of the Van Nuys Hotel erected in 1896 in Downtown Los Angeles.

As the City of Los Angeles authorized building William Mulholland's Los Angeles Aqueduct from the Owens Valley to the city and valley, land speculation plans for the Los Angeles Farming and Milling Company property in the San Fernando Valley were developed. Aqueduct construction began in 1905, to be completed in 1913. Afterwards, land only useful for dryland farming could be turned into residential towns, and irrigated crops and orchards.

Los Angeles Suburban Homes Company
The Los Angeles Suburban Homes Company, in the "biggest land transaction ever recorded in Los Angeles County", was a syndicate led by Harry Chandler, business manager of the Los Angeles Times, with Isaac Van Nuys, Hobart Johnstone Whitley, and James Boone Lankershim that acquired "Tract 1000" in 1909.  It was acquired from the Los Angeles Farming and Milling Company owned Van Nuys and Lankershim. It encompassed the remaining  of the southern half of the former Rancho Ex-Mission San Fernando land grant—everything west of the Lankershim town limits and south of the old furrow (present day Roscoe Boulevard) to the Simi Hills and Santa Monica Mountains, excluding Rancho Los Encinos and Rancho El Escorpión.

The Los Angeles Suburban Homes Company laid out plans for: three new towns of Van Nuys, Marion (present day Reseda), and Owensmouth (present day Canoga Park and West Hills); a system of roads and streets; and incorporation into the city of Los Angeles to receive the upcoming aqueduct's water. In the "Sale of the Century" in November 1910 they sold the remaining livestock and non-land assets of the Los Angeles Farming and Milling Company at auction. The Los Angeles Times called the auction "the beginning of a new empire and a new era in the Southland". On February 22, 1911, lot sales begin for the new town of Van Nuys. The Janss Investment Company was the initial developer of both it and Owensmouth.

Personal life
In 1880, he married Susanna H. Lankershim of Los Angeles, the daughter of Isaac Lankershim (1818–1882) and the sister of James Boon Lankershim (1850–1931), both of whom were his business partners. They had three children: Annis H.; James Benton; and Kate. He was a member of the Masonic order, connected with Pentalpha Blue Lodge, Signet Chapter, Los Angeles Commandery and Al Malaikah Shrine Temple. He was a Republican and member of the Baptist church. He also founded Hollywood Cemetery.

He died at age 75, on February 12, 1912. He is interred (in Section G, Lot 118) at the Evergreen Cemetery in East Los Angeles, with a tall and distinctive monument.

Legacy
On February 23, 1944, a Liberty Ship was named for Van Nuys, and launched at Los Angeles Harbor in San Pedro, California.

See also
Van Nuys, Los Angeles, California
Van Nuys, Indiana
History of the San Fernando Valley to 1915

References

Further reading
History of Livingston County, New York by James H. Smith, published by D. Mason & Co, Syracuse, NY

External links
American History and Genealogy Project California section - Isaac Newton Van Nuys

American bankers
American city founders
Businesspeople from Los Angeles
Land owners from California
1836 births
1912 deaths
California pioneers
History of Los Angeles
History of the San Fernando Valley
American people of Dutch descent
People from Livingston County, New York
People from the San Fernando Valley
California Republicans
Burials at Evergreen Cemetery, Los Angeles
People in 19th-century California
19th century in Los Angeles
19th-century American businesspeople